The South Tyrolean Homeland Federation (SHB) was a political party active in South Tyrol.

It was launched in 1983 as Election Association of Homeland Federation (Wahlverband des Heimatbundes, Heimatbund) and won 4.2% in the 1983 general election and 2.6% in the 1983 provincial election, enough for granting Eva Klotz a seat in the Provincial Council. In 1988 the party obtained 2.3% and Klotz was re-elected to the Council. In 1989 the party merged with the Freedom Party of South Tyrol of Gerold Meraner (1.4% in 1988) and conservative splinters from the South Tyrolean People's Party led by Alfons Benedikter to form Union for South Tyrol.

References

Political parties established in 1974
Political parties disestablished in 1989
Defunct political parties in South Tyrol
South Tyrolean nationalism
German nationalist political parties